Simrik Air Pvt. Ltd. is a helicopter airline based at Tribhuvan International Airport in Kathmandu, Nepal. It operates chartered helicopter services. The company was established in 2001. It was a partner of Simrik Airlines, which operates scheduled fixed-wing services, until latter airline was rebranded as Guna Airlines in 2021. Simrik Air also partners with Swiss helicopter operator Air Zermatt, which helps with pilot training.

Fleet

Current fleet
The Simrik Air fleet consists of the following aircraft (as of June 2020):

Former fleet
 Mil Mi-8MTV-1

Accidents and incidents 
 28 May 2003 - A Simrik Air Mil Mi-8MTV-1 crashed while approaching Everest Base Camp. Two passengers were killed and nine injured.
 23 November 2006 - A Simrik Air Mil Mi-8MTV-1 crashed during an emergency landing in Jumla District.
 22 June 2015 - A Simrik Air Eurocopter AS 350 caught fire after a bird strike in Gorkha District and had to make an emergency landing. All five persons on board were reported to be safe.
 30 June 2018 - A Simrik Air Eurocopter AS 350 crashed during a landing at Grande International Hospital in Kathmandu. No passenger was harmed, however the video of which went viral.

References

External links

 

Airlines of Nepal
Airlines established in 2001
2001 establishments in Asia
2001 establishments in Nepal